Veronica gracilis is a plant belonging to the family Plantaginaceae, commonly known as slender speedwell. It is a perennial herb with slender branches, variable shaped leaves and small lilac flowers in spring and summer.

Description
The erect stems grow from the rhizome at ground level and are covered with short, stiff, soft hairs. The leaf margins are smooth or sometimes with a few sharp teeth, the edges rolled up-ward or spreading. The flower petals are pale mauve or blue with purple veins. Flowers from September to December.

Taxonomy and naming
Veronica gracilis was first formally described in 1810 by Robert Brown and published the description in Prodromus florae Novae Hollandiae et insulae Van-Diemen, exhibens characteres plantarum quas annis 1802-1805. The specific epithet (gracilis) is a Latin word meaning "slender" and "thin".

Distribution and habitat
Slender speedwell is a widespread Australian species. In New South Wales it grows mainly on the northern and southern tablelands. In Victoria a widespread species across the state. In South Australia a rare species occurring in three localities on coastal fringes. A common widespread species in the Australian Capital Territory. Found growing in all distributions in wet well drained soils, grassland and eucalypt woodland in either full sun or heavily shaded positions.

References

Flora of South Australia
Victoria
Flora of New South Wales
gracilis
Plants described in 1810